VolAir was a Dominican-based airline that offered flights between many airports in the Dominican Republic and Haiti. Its hub was La Isabela International Airport in Santo Domingo.

History
Volair was founded in 2003 and carries more than 3,000 passengers on its 8 white and yellow coloured aircraft. More than 6 airports in Dominican Republic are served. Aircraft range from the Cessna 172 with 3 seats to the Jetstream with seating up to 19.

Fleet
Volair operated with a varied fleet of light commercial aircraft.
1 Piper Chieftain
2 Britten-Norman Islander Picture: VolAir at STI
3 BAe Jetstream 32
2 Let L-410
1 Cessna 206
2 Cessna 402

Destinations

Las Américas International Airport
La Isabela International Airport
Cibao International Airport
Punta Cana International Airport
Gregorio Luperón International Airport
La Romana International Airport
María Montez International Airport
Arroyo Barril International Airport
Cabo Rojo Airport
Constanza Airport
Osvaldo Virgil Airport
Dajabón Airport
Cap-Haitien International Airport

References

External links

VolAir

Defunct airlines of the Dominican Republic
Airlines established in 2003